Hana Fukárková (born 7 February 1964) is a retired Czech tennis player.

Tennis career
Fukárková's junior career included a runner-up finish at the 1981 Orange Bowl and a Wimbledon girls' doubles semi-final the following year.

On the professional tour, Fukárková twice qualified for the singles main draw of the French Open in 1984 and 1987, losing in the first round both times. In between those appearances, she reached the second round of the doubles at the 1986 French Open, partnering Jana Novotná. She made two WTA Tour quarterfinals during her career, at Paris in 1987 and Sofia in 1988. Her performance in Paris included a win over Arantxa Sánchez Vicario.

Personal
Fukárková now lives in Salzburg, Austria and works as a tennis coach.

ITF finals

Singles (1–4)

Doubles (10–5)

References

External links
 
 

1964 births
Living people
Czechoslovak female tennis players
Czech female tennis players